PlatterMania is a 1982 video game written by Michael Farren for the Atari 8-bit family and published by Epyx.

Gameplay
PlatterMania is a game in which the player uses long poles like a juggler to balance spinning plates on top of them.

Reception
Allen Doum reviewed the game for Computer Gaming World, and stated that "Since the same circus tune plays during each interlude, with no way to turn it off, this game seems aimed at children, but the children who played it for us got bored nearly as fast as the adults."

Reviews
Electronic Fun with Computers & Games - Mar, 1983

See also
Dishaster

References

External links
Book of Atari Software 1983

1982 video games
Atari 8-bit family games
Atari 8-bit family-only games
Epyx games
Video games about clowns
Video games developed in the United States